Una Grace Budd (born 28 October 1975) is an Irish former cricketer who played as a right-handed batter. She appeared in three One Day Internationals for Ireland between 2003 and 2005.

Budd was born in Dublin. Her younger sister, Aoife Budd, also played international cricket for Ireland. Budd made her debut for Ireland in 1998, on a tour of England. However, her international debut came over five years later, when she played an ODI match against Scotland at the 2003 IWCC Trophy in the Netherlands. She scored 33* on debut, which was to be the highest score of her ODI career. Budd made her final appearances for Ireland at the 2005 World Cup in South Africa. She played in all six of her team's matches, making 43 runs from five innings.

References

External links
 
 

1975 births
Living people
Cricketers from Dublin (city)
Irish women cricketers
Ireland women One Day International cricketers